Podalada is a village in Razole Mandal, Dr. B.R. Ambedkar Konaseema district in the state of Andhra Pradesh in India.

Geography 

Demographics 
 India census, Podalada had a population of 2815, out of which 1406 were male and 1409 were female. The population of children below 6 years of age was 10%. The literacy rate of the village was 83%.

References 

Villages in Razole mandal